Tabernaemontana humblotii is a species of plant in the family Apocynaceae. It is found in Madagascar.

References

humblotii
Taxa named by Henri Ernest Baillon
Taxa named by Marcel Pichon